The 2023 African Badminton Championships is the continental badminton championships to crown the best players and teams across Africa. The tournament was held at the John Barrable Hall in Benoni, South Africa, from 13 to 19 February 2023.

Tournament 
The 2023 African Badminton Championships were held in two separate events. The mixed team event, officially All Africa Mixed Team Championships 2023, was a continental tournament to crown the best team in Africa and qualification to 2023 Sudirman Cup holding from 13 to 16 February. A total of 13 countries across Africa registered their players to compete at mixed team event. 

The individual event, officially All Africa Individual Championships 2023, was a continental tournament to crown the best players in Africa holding from 17 to 19 February.

Venue 
This tournament was held at the John Barrable Hall in Benoni with four courts.

Point distribution
The individual event of this tournament was graded based on the BWF points system for the BWF International Challenge event. Below is the table with the point distribution for each phase of the tournament.

Medalists

Medal table

Team event

Group A

Algeria vs Lesotho

Nigeria vs Zimbabwe

Algeria vs Zimbabwe

Nigeria vs Lesotho

Algeria vs Nigeria

Zimbabwe vs Lesotho

Group B

South Africa vs Mozambique

Uganda vs Mozambique

South Africa vs Uganda

Group C

Egypt vs Cameroon

Zambia vs Cameroon

Egypt vs Zambia

Group D

Mauritius vs Botswana

Réunion vs Botswana

Mauritius vs Réunion

Knockout stage

Bracket

Quarter-finals

Egypt vs Uganda

South Africa vs Zambia

Nigeria vs Mauritius

Réunion vs Algeria

Semi-finals

Egypt vs South Africa

Mauritius vs Algeria

Finals

Egypt vs Mauritius

Final ranking

Individual event

Men's singles

Women's singles

Men's doubles

Women's doubles

Mixed doubles

References

External links 
 Individual result
 Team result

African Badminton Championships
African Badminton Championships
African Badminton Championships
African Badminton Championships
Badminton tournaments in South Africa
African Badminton Championships